Puumala orthohantavirus (PUUV) is a species of Orthohantavirus. Humans infected with the virus may develop a haemorrhagic fever with renal syndrome (HFRS) known as nephropathia epidemica. Puumala orthohantavirus HFRS is lethal in less than 0.5% of the cases. Rarely, PUUV infection can cause Guillain-Barré syndrome.

Puumala orthohantavirus  was discovered and named in 1980 named after Puumala, a municipality in Finland. The virus is found predominantly in Scandinavia and Finland, although it has also been reported elsewhere in Northern Europe, Poland and Russia. Because the bank vole (Myodes glareolus) acts as a reservoir for the virus, nephropathia epidemica cases track with the vole population in a three- to four-year cycle. Humans are infected through inhalation of dust from vole droppings.It has been theorized that Puumala orthohantavirus, unlike other members of the genus Orthohantavirus, may also have lethal effects on its rodent host.

In August 2014 an Israeli researcher studying the behavior of the bank vole in Finland died after contracting the Puumala orthohantavirus, which caused a complete breakdown of her immune system.

References

Hantaviridae
Rodent-carried diseases